Jordanita rungsi is a moth of the family Zygaenidae. It is found in the central areas of the Middle Atlas in Morocco.

The length of the forewings is 11.9–12.2 mm for males and 11.0–11.2 mm for females.

The larvae feed on Carthamus calvus. Pupation takes place in a cocoon in the soil.

References

C. M. Naumann, W. G. Tremewan: The Western Palaearctic Zygaenidae. Apollo Books, Stenstrup 1999,

External links
The Barcode of Life Data Systems (BOLD)

Procridinae
Moths described in 1973
Endemic fauna of Morocco
Moths of Africa